Andy Kotelnicki is an American football coach who is the offensive coordinator at the University of Kansas.

Early life and playing career
Kotelnicki grew up in Litchfield, Minnesota and attended Litchfield High School. He played college football at the University of Wisconsin-River Falls, where he was a team captain as a senior.

Coaching career
Kotelnicki began his coaching career as a student offensive line coach during his senior year at Wisconsin–River Falls. He was hired as an offensive assistant at Western Illinois in 2004. After two seasons, he returned to UW-River Falls as the Falcons' offensive coordinator. Kotelnicki was hired as the offensive coordinator of Division II University of Mary in 2013 and coached there for two seasons before being hired by Lance Leipold at Wisconsin–Whitewater for the same position. Kotelnicki followed Leipold after he was hired as the head coach of the University at Buffalo.

Kotelnicki was hired at the University of Kansas after Leipold left Buffalo to become the Jayhawks' head coach in 2021. He added more option elements to Kansas' offense to compliment the skillset of starting quarterback Jalon Daniels for the 2022 season, in which the team became bowl-eligible for the first time since 2008. During the season, Kotelnicki was nominated for the Broyles Award. After the season, he signed a contract extension through the 2027 season that also raised his yearly salary from $500,000 per year to $1 million per year.

Personal life
Kotelnicki's brother, Josh Kotelnicki, is also a football coach and was previously the head coach at the University of Mary.

References

External links
 Kansas profile

Year of birth missing (living people)
Living people
American football centers
Buffalo Bulls football coaches
Kansas Jayhawks football coaches
Mary Marauders football coaches
Western Illinois Leathernecks football coaches
Wisconsin–River Falls Falcons football coaches
Wisconsin–River Falls Falcons football players
Wisconsin–Whitewater Warhawks football coaches